Lagocheirus cristulatus is a species of longhorn beetles of the subfamily Lamiinae. It was described by Bates in 1872, and is known from southern central Mexico to Costa Rica.

References

Beetles described in 1872
Lagocheirus